Standing Horse is a tomb figure created during the Tang dynasty in China. In ancient China, numerous tomb figurines and other artefacts were designed specifically to be buried with the deceased in large burial mounds. This large figurine features the use of Sancai, a glazing technique popular during the Tang dynasty.

Form, material and technique 

The form of this sculpture appears to be harmoniously symmetrical at first glance. However, on further scrutiny, it is clear that the shape of the sculpture is deeply organic, revealing a varied contour of curves and edges. When a spotlight is shone on the sculpture, deep pockets of shadows on the sculpture contrast starkly with illuminating highlights that reflect off its shiny, glazed surface.

As a historical artefact that is more than 1000-year-old, it is very well-preserved. It was created with earthenware, which is a durable material. Bronze and wood were 2 other materials commonly used to create sculptures and tomb artefacts in this period and region. However, earthenware was a more practical material for tomb artefacts because it was more affordable than bronze, and more durable than wood.

The Sancai technique literally means ‘three colours’. However, the colours of the glazes were not limited to three in number. This technique is especially associated with the Tang Dynasty. The Sancai glaze is highly durable – most ceramics glazed with this technique has endured till today. The use of Sancai glazing on figures was expensive and required skilful craftsmanship. Sumptuary laws also restricted the usage of Sancai glaze to the upper classes, and production was controlled by the imperial bureaucracy.

Iconographical analysis 
An iconography of a work of art is the analysis of the visual images and symbols employed.  

As an expressional subject matter, this figurine of a horse is depicted proportionally and realistically, with great attention paid to its anatomical accuracy, colour treatment, texture and embellishments.

The high level of craftsmanship reflected on this sculpture demonstrate the lifelikeness and physical characteristics that this horse is supposed to embody: a handsome adult horse with an athletic body and a body of mane that is smooth, shiny and neat. Its posture is upright, its eyes are wide-opened and its head cocked at an angle that is upright but not facing upward.

The colours applied on this horse further enhance the lifelikeness of the horse, making it look very similar to a real horse. The contrast of green against brown on this sculpture, directs the viewer's attention immediately to the elaborate harness on the horse, so that viewers would notice the distinctive decoration on this harness.

The intricate details rendered on the horse's harness offers viewers an insight into the type of horse this sculpture is supposed to represent: a Ferghana horse from Central Asia. Ferghana horses were very commonly depicted in Tang dynasty tomb figures.

Iconological analysis 
An iconology of a work of art is the interpretation of the symbolism in the visual imagery, especially in a broader sociopolitical context, so as to determine the underlying attitudes and characteristics of a civilisation.

Caring for the afterlife 

The ancient Chinese believed that every person has 2 souls – 1 is called ‘hun’ and the other is called ‘po’. When a person passes on, the hun soul leaves the body and ascends to heaven, while the po soul remains with the corpse. In ancient China, tomb artefacts were created specifically for the po soul to use in its afterlife, according to what the deceased usually needed and wanted when he or she was alive. The primary purpose of a tomb artefact was to care for its deceased master in his or her afterlife. Therefore, studying the tomb artefacts from different Chinese dynasties helps one to understand the changing social and historical circumstances of each dynasty, since the people of different dynasties had different needs and wants, depending on the sociopolitical situation of each dynasty.   

For instance, numerous tomb artefacts of soldiers (also known as a "terracotta army") have been found in the Mausoleum of the First Qin Emperor. The Qin dynasty was militaristic, heavy-handed and bureaucratic - it was a time of intense and constant warfare with its neighbours and its military was the most powerful and technologically advanced in the world. Therefore, it is unsurprising to find an overwhelming quantity of tomb figurines cast in the image of soldiers in the tomb of Qin Shi Huang, the first emperor of China.

On the other hand, we find this chessboard set in a tomb from the Han dynasty. The Han dynasty was still a time of constant warfare. However, arts and culture were valued and widespread, and the Han Chinese had more freedom to debate philosophical issues and enjoy intellectual games, such as this game of chess. Chess was believed to help people understand military strategies.

During the Tang dynasty, the socio-political condition of China was dramatically different from the Qin and Han dynasties, leading to the production of tomb artefacts that were dramatically different too. Tang dynasty was one that was characterized by its extravagance, prosperity, stability and competitiveness, and these attributes are understandably reflected in the characteristics of tomb figurines produced in the Tang dynasty.

Assertion of Tang power 
Another theme that is critical in the interpretation of this figurine of a Central Asian horse is the tense relationship between the nomads of Central Asia and the rest of Asia. Every dynasty in China had military conflicts with the nomads of Central Asia. The Tang empire competed fiercely with the Tibetan empire and the Islamic empires for control of Central Asia.

The nomads of Central Asia were fierce warriors with powerful warhorses. This is due to a combination of geographical and political reasons. Geographically, Central Asia is difficult for agriculture and it is also far from the sea, thereby cutting it off from trading. Hence, nomadic horse people dominated Central Asia for 2000 years. Their nomadic lifestyle naturally trained them to be highly suitable for warfare. Their horse-riding skills and archery techniques made them the most militarily powerful people in the world. Their military power is further sharpened by the fact that East Asia and West Asia were often competing to gain control of Central Asia.

It is in light of this socio-historical context that one realises why it was a source of pride for a Tang dynasty tomb to be filled with horses, camels, female attendants, robust manservants and exotic dancers from Central Asia. During the Tang period, the ability to own powerful horses and servants from Central Asia would have been a testimony of a person's wealth, power and social standing. This is especially since Central Asia was renowned for its military power, strong warriors and formidable horses. It would also have been reflective of a person's stylish, cosmopolitan taste, as it shows that this person is globalised and familiar with cultures outside of China. Many of Tang dynasty's tomb artefacts, such as Standing Horse, were meant to assert Tang China's power over Central Asia.

Opulence of Tang society 

Tang dynasty is generally regarded as a high point in Chinese civilisation, and a golden age of cosmopolitan culture. Many neighbouring countries maintained strong diplomatic ties with it, traded extensively with it and sought its economic assistance and military protection. It was a superpower, akin to the United States of today.

The capital of the Tang dynasty was the most populous city in the world. With this large population, the dynasty was able to have a professional and powerful army. The army not only defended the empire, but was also used to dominate the lucrative trade routes along the Silk Road. A huge population also meant that there were more professional craftsmen in the empire, to create large quantities and higher quality works of art.

It was a period of progress, prosperity and stability, making it a highly conducive environment to pursue the arts. Tomb figurines in the Tang dynasty often featured servants, attendants, dancers, musicians, camels and horses from Central Asia. In the tomb of a high-ranking male, there may also be figurines of soldiers, officials and courtesans.

Performativity of Tang tomb figurines 

Tomb figurines in the Tang dynasty were made to be visually compelling and it is especially obvious when they are seen in an entire set, or when compared with figurines of other dynasties. The intricate details of each figurine's craftsmanship imbue them with a great sense of physical presence and identity. Their personalised facial expressions and postures distinguish each figurine in an imaginable time and space.

This great emphasis on the performativity of tomb figurines could be related to the competitive Tang culture of publicly displaying one's wealth and power. The social classes of Tang society were mobile. This means that people in the different social classes could improve its status through hard work and move to an upper class. This created a competitive society, where people often showed off their wealth and power. Members of prominent families or high-ranking officials often paraded through streets in the public, with troops of servants mounted on beautiful horses. This culture of public display takes place even during funerals. After the funerary ceremonies at home are complete, there would be a funeral procession to transport the deceased from home to gravesite.

The funeral procession is a highly elaborate, visible and competitive public spectacle, designed to impress the public with altars, canopies, flowers, paper figurines, burnt offerings and most importantly, with the display of impressive tomb figurines. The competitive nature of funeral processions got so out of hand, that the emperor had to issue imperial edicts to regulate the quantity and size of tomb figurines, according to the deceased's social status. Tomb artefacts were meant to glorify its deceased master and the master's living family.

Tomb figurines of the Tang dynasty were characterized by its wide variety, high quality, energy, performance and lifelikeness. The tomb figurines of Tang China were unprecedented – never before in Chinese history were the figurines endowed with such qualities. The pursuit of more and more vibrant colours led to the invention of the tri-colour glazing technique, or Sancai glaze, to further enhance the visual appearance of the figurines. This great emphasis on performance burial and extravagant tomb figurines in Tang China, is consistent with Tang China's opulent culture, media and arts. This tomb figurine of a horse, was expected to represent not only itself, but also expected to serve and perform a social and cultural role for the Tang dynasty.

Provenance 

This sculpture currently resides in the Asian Gallery collections of the National Gallery of Australia. It was a gift to the gallery in 1995 by Dr. Tsui Tsin-tong from Hong Kong, through the National Gallery of Australia Foundation.

References
Adshead, S. A. M. T'ang China: The Rise of the East in World History. New York: Palgrave Macmillan, 2004.
Beckwith, Christopher I. The Tibetan Empire in Central Asia. Princeton: Princeton University Press, 1987.
Benn, Charles. China's Golden Age: Everyday Life in the Tang dynasty. New York: Oxford University Press, 2002.
Bentley, Jerry. Old World Encounters: Cross Cultural Contacts and Exchanges in Pre-Modern Times. New York: Oxford University Press, 1993.
Boulnois, Luce. Silk Road: Monks, Warriors & Merchants. Hong Kong: Odyssey Books, 2005.
Di Cosmo, Nicola. Ancient China and Its Enemies: the Rise of Nomadic Power in East Asian History. Cambridge: Cambridge University Press, 2002.
Ebrey, Patricia Buckley, Anne Walthall and James B. Palais. East Asia: A Cultural, Social and Political History. Boston: Houghton Mifflin, 2006.
Eckfeld, Tonia. Imperial Tombs in Tang China, 618-907: The Politics of Paradise. London: Routledge, 2005.
Gernet, Jacques. A History of Chinese Civilization. New York: Cambridge University Press, 1996.
Harrell, Stevan. "The Concept of Soul in Chinese Folk Religion." The Journal of Asian Studies 38 (1979): 519–528.
Hay, Jonathan. "Seeing through dead eyes: How early Tang tombs staged the afterlife." RES: Anthropology and Aesthetics 57/58 (2010): 16–54.
Howard, Angela Falco. Chinese Sculpture. Connecticut: Yale University Press, 2006.
Hsu, Eileen Hsiang-ling. Monks in Glaze: Patronage, Kiln Origin, and Iconography of the Yixian Luohans. Leiden: Brill, 2016.
Hu, Shih. "The Concept of Immortality in Chinese Thought." Harvard Divinity School Bulletin (1946): 26–43.
Lewis, Mark Edward. The Early Chinese Empires: Qin and Han. London: Belknap Press, 2007.
Lewis, Mark Edward. China's Cosmopolitan Empire: The Tang Dynasty. Cambridge: Harvard University Press, 2012.
"Chinese Tang tomb figures," A History of the World in 100 Objects (Britain, BBC/British Museum, 2010). Podcast. https://www.bbc.co.uk/ahistoryoftheworld/objects/9mtCv5mCQ-iz_PRF2p0phw
Medley, Margaret. The Chinese Potter: A Practical History of Chinese Ceramics. London: Phaidon, 1989.
Michaelson, Carol. Gilded Dragons: Buried Treasures from China's Golden Ages (exhibition catalogue). London: British Museum Press, 1999.
Murray, H. J. R. A History of Chess. New York: Oxford University Press, 1913.
Panofsky, Erwin. Studies in Iconology: Humanistic Themes in the Art of the Renaissance. Oxford: Oxford University Press, 1939.
"Performing in the afterlife: performance and performativity of Tang tomb art," Tang Cosmopolitanism: An Interdisciplinary Symposium (Sydney, Art Gallery of New South Wales, 2016). Podcast. https://soundcloud.com/artgalleryofnsw/performing-in-the-afterlife-performance-and-performativity-of-tang-tomb-art?in=artgalleryofnsw/sets/tang-cosmopolitanism
Skaff, Jonathan Karam. Sui-Tang China and Its Turko-Mongol Neighbors: Culture, Power and Connections, 580-800. Oxford University Press, 2012.
Smith, Kenneth Louis. Handbook of visual communication: theory, methods, and media. London: Routledge, 2005.
Soucek, Svatopluk. A History of Inner Asia. Cambridge: Cambridge University Press, 2000.
Thorp, Robert L. and Richard E. Vinograd. Chinese Art and Culture. New Jersey: Prentice Hall, 2003.
Unknown artist. "Standing horse." 618-800. Earthenware with tri-colour Sancai glaze. Tang dynasty: Standing Horse. National Gallery of Australia. 2011. http://artsearch.nga.gov.au/Detail.cfm?IRN=5281
Vainker, S.J. Chinese Pottery and Porcelain. London: British Museum Press, 1991.
Valenstein, Suzanne. A handbook of Chinese ceramics. New York: Metropolitan Museum of Art, 1998.
van de Ven, Hans. "Tibet in Tang's Grand Strategy". In Warfare in Chinese History, edited by Denis Twitchett. Leiden: Koninklijke Brill, 2000.
Wang, Yongxing. Draft Discussion of Early Tang Dynasty's Military Affairs History. Beijing: Kunlun Press, 2003.
Wong, Timothy C. "Self and Society in Tang Dynasty Love Tales." Journal of the American Oriental Society 99 (1979): 95–100
Wood, Nigel. Chinese glazes: their origins, chemistry, and recreation. London: A.C. Black, 1999.

Footnotes

Further reading
Abramson, Marc S. Ethnic identity in Tang China. Philadelphia: University of Pennsylvania Press, 2011.
Barrett, Timothy Hugh. The Woman Who Discovered Printing. Great Britain: Yale University Press, 2008.
Cotterell, Arthur. The Imperial Capitals of China: An Inside View of the Celestial Empire. London: Pimlico, 2007.
de la Vaissière, E. Sogdian Traders. A History. Leiden: Brill, 2005.
Schafer, Edward H. The Vermilion Bird: T'ang Images of the South. Berkeley and Los Angeles: University of California Press, 1967.
Sensabaugh, David K. “Guardians of the Tomb.” Yale University Art Gallery Bulletin (2001): 56-65.
Sewell, Jack V. “T’ang Dynasty Tomb Pottery.” Bulletin of the Art Institute of Chicago 70 (1976): 1-6.
Trubner, Henry. “The Arts of the T’ang Dynasty.” Ars Orientalis 3 (1959): 147-152.
Wang, Zhenping. Tang China in Multi-Polar Asia: A History of Diplomacy and War. Honolulu: University of Hawai'i Press, 2013.

External links 
 Asian Art Collection, Princeton University Art Museum
 Freer Sackler: The Smithsonian’s Museum of Asian Art, Smithsonian Institution
 Home of 300 Tang Poems, University of Virginia
 Internationalism in the Tang Dynasty, The Metropolitan Museum of Art 
 Google Art Project
 Online Museum Resources on Asian Art, Asia for Educators, Columbia University
 Paintings of Sui and Tang dynasties
 Tang art with video commentary, from the Minneapolis Institute of Arts
 The Tang Dynasty at the Metropolitan Museum of Art
 ‘Sancai’, Yale University Art Gallery 
 Zizhi Tongjian, vols. 182, 183, 184, 185, 186, 187, 188, 189, 190, 191, 192, 193, 194, 195, 196, 197, 198, 199.

Tang dynasty art
Funerary art
Chinese ceramic works
7th century in China
8th century in China
Collections of the National Gallery of Australia
Terracotta sculptures